Veterans Memorial High School is a senior high school in Mission, Texas and a part of the Mission Consolidated Independent School District.

It serves sections of Mission, Alton, and Palmhurst.

References

External links
 Veterans Memorial High School

Mission, Texas
Public high schools in Texas
High schools in Hidalgo County, Texas